The Closing Ceremony of the 1996 Summer Olympics took place on August 4, 1996, at the Centennial Olympic Stadium in Atlanta, United States at approximately 8:00 PM EDT (UTC−4). It was produced by Don Mischer.
The official motto of the closing ceremony is "An American Day of Inspiration".

Dignitaries

Dignitaries from International organizations
 International Olympic Committee – 
IOC President Juan Antonio Samaranch and wife Maria Teresa Salisachs-Rowe
and Members of the International Olympic Committee

Host country dignitaries
 United States – 
Vice President of the United States Al Gore 
Second Lady of the United States Tipper Gore 
Mayor of Atlanta Bill Campbell
Governor of Georgia Zell Miller 
President & CEO of ACOG Billy Payne

Foreign Dignitaries from abroad
 Australia – Mayor of Sydney Frank Sartor

Countdown
The ceremony began with a countdown at the screen coming from 22 to 1. Starting at 22, footage from previous games appeared with Atlanta at the end complete with an image of 1996 Summer Olympics opening ceremony with numbers between 22 and 1 being from previous games until 0 from currents games
 22 - 1896 Athens
 21 - 1900 Paris
 20 - 1904 St. Louis
 19 - 1908 London
 18 - 1912 Stockholm
 17 - 1920 Antwerp
 16 - 1924 Paris
 15 - 1928 Amsterdam
 14 - 1932 Los Angeles
 13 - 1936 Berlin
 12 - 1948 London
 11 - 1952 Helsinki
 10 - 1956 Melbourne (Ten)
 9 - 1960 Rome (Nine)
 8 - 1964 Tokyo (Eight)
 7 - 1968 Mexico City (Seven)
 6 - 1972 Munich (Six)
 5 - 1976 Montreal (Five)
 4 - 1980 Moscow (Four)
 3 - 1984 Los Angeles (Three)
 2 - 1988 Seoul (Two)
 1 - 1992 Barcelona (One)
 0 - 1996 Atlanta

Summon the Heroes
The closing ceremony began after a 22-second countdown in tribute to all the past Summer Olympic Games with the Atlanta Olympic Band, led by John Williams, performing his piece "Summon the Heroes". After that, the R&B group Boyz II Men performed the  U.S. anthem. The Greek and Australian (with Sydney being the next host) anthems were performed.

Victory Ceremony
The presentation of the medals in the Men's Marathon followed. 

 Josia Thugwane - Gold
 Lee Bong-Ju - Silver 
 Erick Wainaina - Bronze

Reach
The spectators and athletes then performed a card trick stunt which revealed a laurel wreath similar to the Quilt of Leaves pattern. Members of the Morehouse College Glee Club performed "Faster, High, Stronger". Cuban singer Gloria Estefan then joined the Glee Club and they performed the song "Reach", one of the official songs of the Atlanta Olympic Games.

Next a plethora of BMX bikers, skaters, and skateboarders performed a daring stunt show; such aforementioned sports were invented in the United States. As the show concluded, the 197 flags of the participating nations were carried into the stadium by athletes of each of their respective countries. The song "The Sacred Truce", written exclusively for the occasion, was performed by the Atlanta Olympic Band and the Atlanta Symphony Youth Orchestra. In keeping with tradition with the 1920 Summer Olympics, the flag of a hosting nation (in this case the American flag) was raised beside the Olympic flag that had been flying inside the stadium the past 16 days.  After that, the Greek flag and the Australian flag in honor of the  Sydney,Australia the host city of the Games of the XXVII Olympiad scheduled for September 16 to October 1,2000.

Sydney 2000
In accordance with the Olympic Charter which governs the Closing Ceremony, IOC President Juan Antonio Samaranch called on the youth of the world to assemble in Sydney, in four years, for the next Summer Olympics. In his speech, he denounced the Centennial Olympic Park bombing stating that terrorism cannot stop the Olympic spirit. Samaranch asked for a moment of silence to remember the victims of the bombing, as well as the 11 Israeli athletes of the Munich massacre during the 1972 Summer Olympics. He said that those tragedies will never be forgotten and said: 

Although this was first official IOC recognition of the Munich tragedy since 1972, commentators mentioned 1972 quite often, mainly because the next Olympics were taking place in Nagano, Japan and Japan last hosted an Olympics in 1972, hosting the Winter Games in Sapporo.

Furthermore, Samaranch thanked Atlanta with the phrase "Well done, Atlanta", and calling them "most exceptional." He broke with precedent and did not say they had been the best Olympics ever, as he did at every previous Olympic closing ceremony while he was IOC president. 4 years later he called the Sydney Olympics the best ever, suggesting that this was an intentional omission 4 years earlier. After that, IOC presidents ceased referring to the Olympics as "the best ever", meaning that Sydney was the last host to be honored that way.

Before Samaranch declared the games officially closed, R&B singer Stevie Wonder sang a cover of John Lennon's "Imagine" in memory of the victims of the Cenntennial Olympic Park bombing.

This part of the program culminated in the "Antwerp Ceremony" (so called because the original Olympic flag, which was used for transfer of the Games, was first used at the 1920 Summer Olympics in Antwerp), which is the transfer of the Olympic Flag, from the mayor of Atlanta, Bill Campbell, to Samaranch, and then to the mayor of Sydney, Frank Sartor. Immediately succeeding the transition, an eight-minute elaborate act was presented to introduce the next host country (Australia) and the next host city (Sydney) started. It featured  music of the composers Carl Vine and David Page, as well as dance members from the indigenous Bangarra Dance Theatre,members of the Australian Olympic Team,this segment was directed by Stephen Page and Ric Birch along with the recorded songs by Christine Anu,Djakapurra Munyarrun,Mathew Doyle and Leroy Cummings. The Sydney handover act was called "A Day in the Life of Sydney",and featured representations of aboriginal and beach cultures, the flora and fauna such as the Australian state of New South Wales is home of endemic species of flora and fauna as the Waratah and sulphur-crested cockatoo used a world-know examples. Four inflated balloons arose to form an imaginary Sydney Opera House while members of the Australian Olympic team and local volunteers held up blue Olympic Banners around the prop to form a simulation of the Olympic Rings refleted on the waters of the Sydney Harbour.

Afterwards, Atlanta native mezzo-soprano Jennifer Larmore, along with the Morehouse College Glee Club and the Atlanta Symphony Youth Orchestra sang the Olympic Hymn while the Olympic flag was lowered. This flag would be raised again in Nagano during the opening ceremony of the 1998 Winter Olympics; opening ceremony there took place on February 7, 1998.

Power of the Dream
After the lowering of the Olympic flag and the singing of the Olympic Hymn, some 600 children from Atlanta ranging from ages six though twelve sang a rendition of "The Power of the Dream", which was performed by Celine Dion in the opening ceremony. The segment started with ten-year-old Rachel McMullin singing the first stanza. As the song progresses more children join in creating a full choir. The children line up and hold hands to form the Atlantic Olympic emblem while holding up flashlights. The spectators and athletes then sing and hold hands in unison. At the end of the song, the children shout in unison, "Y'all come back now!" a friendly gesture inviting the athletes and citizens of the world to come together at Sydney four years from that time period, though the next Olympics would happen 18 months afterward in Nagano, Japan, Olympic customs and regulations maintain that the Olympic Winter Games and the Games of the Olympiad (Summer) are separate events.

Extinguishing of the Flame
Highlights of the past events were once more replayed on two jumbotrons in the stadium as the Atlanta Symphony Youth Orchestra performs "The Flame". The crowd was silenced, as Georgia native and country singer Trisha Yearwood sang an a cappella version of the same song. Upon conclusion of the song, the flame extinguished slowly.

Musical finale
The ceremony concluded with an all-star tribute to American popular music. A New Orleans-style funeral commenced the segment which eventually turns into a celebration with elaborate swing music.

An array of performers culminated in the finale which was led by Late Show's Paul Shaffer, and conductor Harold Wheeler. As with most closing ceremonies, the athletes were invited onto the field below the stadium to sing and dance along with the music. Among the performers were:

Gloria Estefan
Sheila E.
Faith Hill
B.B. King
Wynton Marsalis
Little Richard
Pointer Sisters
Tito Puente
Buckwheat Zydeco
Stevie Wonder
Al Green

A fireworks display officially closed the segment, though the performers continued to play music.

Anthems
  Boyz II Men – American national anthem
  Atlanta Symphony Youth Orchestra – Greek national anthem
  Atlanta Symphony Youth Orchestra  – Australian national anthem
  Jennifer Larmore, Morehouse College Glee Club and the Atlanta Symphony Youth Orchestra  – Olympic Hymn
  Atlanta Symphony Youth Orchestra-National anthem of South Africa

Notes

TV coverage

See also 
 2000 Summer Olympics closing ceremony
 2002 Winter Olympics closing ceremony
2004 Summer Olympics closing ceremony
2008 Summer Olympics closing ceremony
2012 Summer Olympics closing ceremony

References

External links
Official Report Vol. 2 Digital Archive from the Amateur Athletic Foundation of Los Angeles including detailed synopsis of the closing ceremony.

Ceremony Closing
Olympics closing ceremonies
Ceremonies in the United States